Reier Gjellebøl (22 April 1737 – 24 November 1803) was a Norwegian priest and writer.

He was born at Høland in Akershus. He took matriculation exam at Copenhagen in 1755. Then he continued his study of theology. He was first a teacher in Denmark. He served as parish priest in Valle from 1772 and in Stavanger from 1782. He is known for his topographical descriptions of the parish of Høland (1771), and of the valley and district of Setesdalen (finished 1777, printed 1800).

References

1737 births
1803 deaths
People from Akershus
19th-century Norwegian Lutheran clergy
Norwegian writers
18th-century Norwegian Lutheran clergy